Myristica guillauminiana is a species of plant in the family Myristicaceae and in the order Magnoliales. It can be found in Fiji and the Solomon Islands.

References

guillauminiana
Least concern plants
Flora of Fiji
Flora of the Solomon Islands (archipelago)
Taxonomy articles created by Polbot